Gimlebreen is a glacier in Gustav V Land at Nordaustlandet, Svalbard. It is located north of the headland of Brageneset. Gimlebreen is a glacier stream from the large icecap Vestfonna.

References

Glaciers of Nordaustlandet